Edward Samuel Goodnow (October 6, 1874 – January 3, 1949) was a newspaper illustrator and author. He operated an art school for illustrators.

Biography
He was born on October 6, 1874, in Missouri to Charles Edward Goodnow (1842–1916). One of his earliest jobs was working at the Laning Printing Company. On September 17, 1902, he married Lucille Nichols. By 1910 he was living in Euclid, Ohio. In 1914 he wrote Inside Facts about the Earnings, Methods and Requirements of the Newspaper Artist and Advertisement Illustrator: Hints and Helps for the Student of Practical Drawing. By 1918 he was living in Dayton, Kentucky but still working for the Cincinnati Times Star in Cincinnati, Ohio. He died on January 3, 1949, in Bethel, Ohio.

Publications
Goodnow Studio of Practical Drawing, Bellevue, Ohio (1905)
Inside Facts about the Earnings, Methods and Requirements of the Newspaper Artist and Advertisement Illustrator: Hints and Helps for the Student of Practical Drawing (1914)

See also
Art Instruction Schools and their Draw Winky campaign

References

External links

Edward Samuel Goodnow at the Smithsonian Libraries

1874 births
1949 deaths
American cartoonists
People from Dayton, Kentucky
Artists from Cleveland
People from Bellevue, Ohio